Ctenosia nephelistis is a moth of the subfamily Arctiinae. It was described by George Hampson in 1918. It is found in Kenya and Malawi.

References

Lithosiini
Moths described in 1918
Moths of Africa